Twinkle Beauty parlour is an Indian television series that aired on SAB TV.

Cast

 Sulabha Arya	
 Simple Kaul as Sameera 
 Karan Veer Mehra as Rocky
 Manini Mishra as Advocate Ragini
 Rajeev Paul		
 Narayani Shastri as Ranjana
 Smita Bansal as Niyati
 Pankit Thakker	
 Pracheen Chauhan
 Chhavi Mittal	
 Rocky Verma	
 Major Vikramjeet	
 Hasan Zaidi
 Archana Bhatt
 Gulfam Khan
 Chetan Hansraj as Ranjeet Singh

References

External links
 Twinkle Beauty Parlour Lajpat Nagar on the Internet Movie Database

Sony SAB original programming
Indian drama television series
Rose Audio Visuals
2006 Indian television series debuts
Television shows set in Delhi
2006 Indian television series endings